Kerberos was a Swedish language satirical magazine published in Helsinki, Finland, in the period 1917–1921. Its subtitle was Tidskrift för satir och humor (Swedish: Satirical and humor magazine).

History and profile
Kerberos was launched in 1917. The magazine had a liberal political stance although politics was not its sole focus. Because it also featured artistic writings. From 1917 to 1918 it also produced a Finnish language edition which improved the popularity of the magazine. The audience of the magazine was cultural elites. 

Kerberos supported anti-communist and anti-bolshevik views when dealing with the newly founded communist regime in Russia. The magazine authors argued that monarchy would be better option for the country and also, for the interests of Finland. The magazine folded in 1921 and was succeeded by another Swedish language satirical magazine, Garm.

References

External links

1917 establishments in Finland
1921 disestablishments in Finland
Anti-communist works
Cultural magazines
Defunct political magazines published in Finland
Finnish-language magazines
Finnish political satire
Magazines established in 1880
Magazines disestablished in 1924
Satirical magazines
Swedish-language magazines